Jan Kaja (born 1957) is a painter, photographer and publisher.

Kaja was born in Bydgoszcz, Poland. Since 1979, together with Jacek Soliński, he has run an art gallery Authors’ Gallery (org. Galeria Autorska) in Bydgoszcz. 

In 2015 he received from Ministry of Culture and National Heritage (Poland) special medal for his contribution in polish culture.

Information
In 1980s carried out conceptual projects (posters – appeals). Together with Jacek Soliński elaborated and issued a number of monographic art books dedicated to fine artists.

Presented several dozen of solo exhibitions in Poland: Bydgoszcz, Gdańsk, Sopot, Toruń, Warszawa, Łódź, Kraków, Lublin; and abroad in: Paris, Rome, Tokyo and Edinburgh.

Paintings
His paintings are based on a relation between a face and hands and they constitute peculiar one-person theatre. The painter treats his work as a return to the state of spontaneity thanks to which is able to discover a human in their entire simplicity of expression and at the same time with their spiritual profundity. Made cycles of paintings: "Characters unreal", "Gates", "Way of the Cross", "Conversations".

Paintings (selection)

Bibliography
"Chwile obecności (1979-2004)" Publisher: Galeria Autorska,  Bydgoszcz, 2004,

See also
 List of Polish painters

References

External links
  - official website of Galeria Autorska
   - biography on the website of Galeria Autorska
  - exhibition in Poland (35 anniversary of gallery).
   - information about artist in portal Bydgoszcz24
  - information about exhibition in Rome

Polish contemporary artists
Polish painters
Polish male painters
1957 births
Artists from Bydgoszcz
Living people